Myodocha longicollis is a species of long-necked seed bug found in Central and South America

References

Rhyparochromidae